Flight Park State Recreation Area is a state park in northern Utah, United States, dedicated to hang gliding and paragliding.

Description
The park is located on the south side of Point of the Mountain, just north of Lehi.  Flight Park is jointly managed by Utah State Parks and the Utah Hang Gliding and Paragliding Association (UHGPGA). It is known as one of the best training sites for both paragliding and hang gliding.

Just west of the parking lot there is a modelport for radio control airplanes and helicopters.

The park is located almost entirely in northern Utah County, although a tiny section of its northwest corner extends into Salt Lake County, according to the map on its official website.

See also

 List of Utah State Parks

References

External links

 

Protected areas established in 2006
Protected areas of Salt Lake County, Utah
Protected areas of Utah County, Utah
State parks of Utah